Tomáš Staněk (born 13 June 1991) is a Czech athlete specialising in the shot put. He represented his country at the 2017 World Championships, finishing fourth. He won the silver medal at the 2017 European Indoor Championships.

His personal bests in the event are 22.01 metres outdoors (Schönebeck 2017) and 21.61 indoors (Ostrava 2018).

Competition record

References

1991 births
Living people
Czech male shot putters
World Athletics Championships athletes for the Czech Republic
Athletes (track and field) at the 2016 Summer Olympics
Olympic athletes of the Czech Republic
Athletes from Prague
Czech Athletics Championships winners
European Athletics Indoor Championships winners
Athletes (track and field) at the 2020 Summer Olympics
European Athletics Championships medalists
World Athletics Indoor Championships medalists